Oliver Otis Howard (1830–1909) was a Union Army major general. General Howard may also refer to:

United Kingdom
Charles Howard (British Army officer) (c. 1696–1765), British Army general
Charles Howard, 1st Earl of Carlisle (1628–1685), English Army lieutenant general
Francis Howard (British Army officer, born 1848) (1848–1930), British Army major general
Francis Howard, 1st Earl of Effingham (1683–1743), British Army lieutenant general
Geoffrey Howard (British Army officer) (1876–1966), British Army lieutenant general
George Howard (British Army officer) (1718–1796), British Army general
John Howard, 15th Earl of Suffolk (1739–1820), British Army general
Kenneth Howard, 1st Earl of Effingham (1767–1845), British Army lieutenant general
Thomas Howard (British Army officer, born 1684) (1684–1753), British Army lieutenant general
Thomas Howard, 2nd Earl of Effingham (1714–1763), British Army lieutenant general

United States
Archie F. Howard (1892–1964), U.S. Marine Corps major general
Benjamin Howard (Missouri politician) (1760–1814), U.S. Army brigadier general
Benjamin Chew Howard (1791–1872), Maryland Militia brigadier general
Edwin B. Howard (1901–1993), U.S. Army brigadier general
Harold Palmer Howard (1866–1951), U.S. Army brigadier general
James H. Howard (1913–1995) U.S. Air Force brigadier general
Michael L. Howard (1980s–2020s), U.S. Army lieutenant general
Russell D. Howard (fl. 1970s–2000s), U.S. Army brigadier general
Samuel L. Howard (1891–1960), U.S. Marine Corps general

See also
Patrick Howard-Dobson (1921–2009), British Army general
Edward Howard-Vyse (1905–1992), British Army lieutenant general
Richard Howard-Vyse (1883–1962), British Army major general
John Eager Howard (1752–1827), declined commission as a U.S. Army brigadier general
Attorney General Howard (disambiguation)